The Henry Knox Trail, also known as the Knox Cannon Trail, is a network of roads and paths that traces the route of Colonel Henry Knox's "noble train of artillery" from Crown Point to the Continental Army camp outside Boston, Massachusetts early in the American Revolutionary War.

History

Knox was commissioned by Continental Army commander George Washington in 1775 to transport 59 cannons from captured forts on Lake Champlain, 30 from Fort Ticonderoga and 29 from Crown Point, to the army camp outside Boston to aid the war effort there against British forces. They included forty-three heavy brass and iron cannons, six cohorns, eight mortars, and two howitzers. Knox, using sledges pulled by teams of oxen to haul these cannons, many weighing over a ton, crossed an icy Lake George in mid-winter. He proceeded to travel through rural New York and the snow-covered Berkshire Mountains of Massachusetts, finally arriving to the aid of the beleaguered Continental Army in January 1776.

Marker placement
In 1926, the 150th anniversary of Knox's march, the states of New York and Massachusetts both began installing commemorative plaques at 56 locations in the two states that trace the route the expedition passed through. The exact nature of the collaboration between the two states is unclear, however the work was completed in 1927. The New York markers' bronze reliefs were designed by Henry James Albright, and the Massachusetts reliefs by Henry L. Norton.

In 1975, the marker locations between Kinderhook, New York, and Alford, Massachusetts, were updated after new research, confirming theories originally advanced by North Egremont, Massachusetts, postmaster Joseph Elliott, found Knox did not pass through Claverack, New York. A new marker was added to the trail at Roxbury Heritage State Park in Boston in 2009, adjacent to a house owned by General John Thomas, who guided the weapons received from Knox to their final placement on Dorchester Heights overlooking Boston.

Table of Knox Trail Markers

Photo gallery

References

External links
Knox Trail monuments (Flickr set) – As of 13 May 2010 includes photos of the fifteen markers from Rensselaer to Westfield.

American Revolutionary War sites
Historic trails and roads in the United States
Massachusetts in the American Revolution
New York (state) in the American Revolution